For Today is an American Christian metalcore band.

For Today may also refer to:

 "For Today" (song), by Ayaka
 "For Today", a song by Netherworld Dancing Toys